"Treehouse of Horror VIII" is the fourth episode of the ninth season of the American animated television series The Simpsons. It first aired on the Fox network in the United States on October 26, 1997. In the eighth annual Treehouse of Horror episode, Homer Simpson is the last Springfieldian left alive when a neutron bomb destroys Springfield until a gang of mutants come after him, Homer buys a transporter that Bart uses to switch bodies with a housefly, and Marge is accused of witchcraft in a Puritan rendition of Springfield in 1649. It was written by Mike Scully, David X. Cohen and Ned Goldreyer, and was directed by Mark Kirkland.

Plot

Opening
A censor for the Fox network named Fox Censor is sitting at his desk going through the show's script, censoring some things and explaining to the audience that the episode is rated TV-G with no violence or anything explicit. As he continues talking, a hand reaches with a sword from the rating and stabs him many times with the rating changing from TV-G to TV-PG, TV-14, TV-MA to the fictional ratings TV-21 and TV-666. He falls on his desk dead and his blood spells the title, "The Simpsons Halloween Special VIII". In this episode, the couch gag features the family sitting on the couch with metal shackles and caps attached to their bodies while electrocuting them.

The HΩmega Man

After Mayor Quimby makes an offensive joke about France, the French president launches a neutron bomb directly into Springfield, apparently killing everyone except Homer, who had been inspecting a bomb shelter he was considering buying from Herman. Homer emerges and seems to be the only person in Springfield left alive. Initially grieving for his loved ones, Homer perks up, realizing that being the last person allows him to do everything he always wanted to. While dancing naked in church, he is confronted by a band of hostile Springfield citizens who have become mutants from the blast. Homer flees back home where he discovers that his family survived as their house was protected by its many layers of lead paint. Marge and the children kill the mutants with shotguns and then the family head off to steal some Ferraris.

Fly vs. Fly
Homer buys a matter transporter from Professor Frink. Bart sees the family pets inadvertently go through the transporter together, resulting in a DNA mismatch. This gives him the idea to enter the teleporter with a fly, thinking that he will become a mutant superhero. However, the machine simply switches their heads around. Bart appeals to Lisa for help, but she is chased by the fly and cornered in the kitchen. Bart tries to stop the fighting, but is eaten by the fly. Lisa then pushes the fly into the teleporter. Bart comes out the other end, fully restored. Homer furiously chases Bart with an axe for messing with the device.

Easy-Bake Coven
In 1649, the town is witness to many witch burnings. In the church, the townspeople try to figure out whom to condemn next. People begin accusing others and soon they erupt into chaos, until Marge intervenes. She tries to talk sense into the townspeople, but Moe accuses her of being a witch. Quimby assures her that she is entitled to due process which means she will be thrown off a cliff with a broomstick; if she is a witch she will be able to fly to safety, in which case the authorities expect her to report back for punishment. If she is not a witch, then she will fall to an honorable Christian death. After being shoved off the cliff, Marge flies up on the broomstick revealing that she really is a witch and vows to conquer the whole town. She returns to her sisters Patty and Selma. The sisters watch Ned and Maude Flanders talking about how the witches eat children, which gives them the notion to do just that. They knock on the Flanders' door and demand their sons, but before they leave, Maude offers the witches gingerbread men instead. The witches like these better than the children so they go to each house, getting goodies in exchange for not eating the children. As they fly off, the Sea Captain says that is how the tradition of Halloween and trick-or-treating started.

Production
"The HΩmega Man" was written by Mike Scully, "Fly Vs. Fly" was written by David X. Cohen, and "Easy-Bake Coven" was written by Ned Goldreyer. Large portions of the "Fly vs. Fly" segment were cut, including the original ending where the fly also emerges from the teleporter, but is considerably larger and the Simpson family ride it to the mall.

The producers had trouble with the censors over several segments in this episode. The opening segment of the episode, which features the aforementioned censor Fox Censor being stabbed to death, was pitched by David Mirkin and had a difficult time getting through the real-life censors. They had issues with the size of the knife and the sound effects used. Originally, the TV-rating was supposed to stab Censor with a dagger, but Fox objected because it was too gruesome and was changed to a cutlass. The censors also objected to an unaired scene where Homer does his naked church dance on an altar. The scene was reanimated so that Homer was dancing naked in the front row.

This episode was the only Treehouse of Horror episode that was directed by Mark Kirkland. It was also the last episode Brad Bird worked on; he left the show to direct The Iron Giant at Warner Bros. Animation. "Easy-Bake Coven" was storyboarded by Kirkland and the backgrounds were designed by Lance Wilder. Although Kang and Kodos make brief appearances in every Treehouse of Horror episode, their brief appearance in this one was nearly cut. David X. Cohen managed to persuade the producers to leave the scene in.

Cultural references
As with the majority of the Treehouse of Horror episodes, numerous cultural references are made throughout the episode. "The HΩmega Man" is an extended homage to film The Omega Man, which was one of Mike Scully's favorite movies as a child. In the same segment, Homer runs over Johnny and Edgar Winter while fleeing the mutants pursuing him, mistaking them as mutants as the Winter brothers are both albino. Homer doesn't seem to "get" Gary Larson's calendar. In the movie theater Homer watches a David Spade/Chris Farley comedy, just six and a half weeks after the episode aired Farley died of a drug overdose at age 33.

The title "Fly vs. Fly" is a reference to the Mad magazine comic strip "Spy vs. Spy", while the segment itself is based on the film The Fly, with elements from the remake by David Cronenberg, primarily the telepod design. In "Easy-Bake Coven", the animators referenced the film The Crucible for many of their designs, and Edna Krabappel is wearing a Scarlet A, which is a reference to the novel The Scarlet Letter.

"Easy Bake Coven" makes a reference the TV show Bewitched; when Patty and Selma refer to Homer as "Derwood", Marge corrects them, "His name is Homer."  In Bewitched, Samantha's mother Endora often referred to Darrin as "Derwood" (among other things), whereupon Samantha often corrected her with "His name is Darrin."

Reception
In its original broadcast, "Treehouse of Horror VIII" finished 18th in ratings for the week of October 20–26, 1997, with a Nielsen rating of 11.2, equivalent to  approximately 10.9 million viewing households. It was the highest-rated show on the Fox network that week, beating King of the Hill.

"Treehouse of Horror VIII" won a Golden Reel Award in 1998 for "Best Sound Editing – Television Animated Specials" for Robert Mackston, Travis Powers, Norm MacLeod and Terry Greene. Alf Clausen received an Emmy Award nomination for "Outstanding Music Composition for a Series (Dramatic Underscore)" for this episode, which he ultimately lost. The A.V. Club named Comic Book Guy's line "Oh, I've wasted my life" as one of the quotes from The Simpsons that can be used in everyday situations.

In a retrospective review for The A. V. Club, Erik Adams praised Alf Clausen's score, "its mournful oboe like a fall breeze shaking the last leaves from the branches. The 'Treehouse' franchise is a yearly showcase for Clausen’s work, and he doesn’t disappoint here." The original "Treehouse of Horror" was the first episode scored by Clausen.

References

External links

The Simpsons (season 9) episodes
1997 American television episodes
Fiction set in 1649
Treehouse of Horror
Television episodes about witchcraft
Salem witch trials in fiction
Fiction about shapeshifting
Television episodes written by David X. Cohen
Post-apocalyptic television episodes
Halloween television episodes
Teleportation in fiction
Television episodes about nuclear war and weapons
Mutants in fiction

it:La paura fa novanta I-X#La paura fa novanta VIII